XEPUR-AM (La Voz de los Purépechas) is an indigenous community radio station that broadcasts in Spanish and Purepecha from Cherán in the Mexican state of Michoacán. It is run by the Cultural Indigenist Broadcasting System (SRCI) of the National Commission for the Development of Indigenous Peoples (CDI).

External links
XEPUR website
Locator
FCC information for XEPUR

References

Sistema de Radiodifusoras Culturales Indígenas
Radio stations in Michoacán
Purépecha-language radio stations
Radio stations established in 1982
Daytime-only radio stations in Mexico